Richland County is a county located in the U.S. state of Illinois. According to the 2020 United States census, it had a population of 15,813. Its county seat is Olney.

History
Richland County was established in 1841 out of portions of East part of Clay and West part of Lawrence counties. It was named for Richland County, Ohio, where many of the early settlers migrated from.

Geography

Climate and weather

Major highways
  U.S. Route 50
  Illinois Route 130
  Illinois Route 250

Adjacent counties
 Jasper County (north)
 Crawford County (northeast)
 Lawrence County (east)
 Wabash County (southeast)
 Edwards County (south)
 Wayne County (southwest)
 Clay County (west)

Demographics

As of the 2010 United States Census, there were 16,233 people, 6,726 households, and 4,438 families residing in the county. By 2020, the population had decreased to 15,813 people. The 2010 racial makeup of the county was 97.3% white (94.2%, 2020), 0.7% Asian (0.8%, 2020), 0.5% black or African American (same, 2020), 0.2% American Indian (same, 2020), 0.4% (0.5%, 2020) from other races, and 0.9% from two or more races (3.7%, 2020). Those of Hispanic or Latino origin made up 1.3% (1.7%, 2020) of the population. In terms of ancestry, 29.6% were German, 11.7% were American, 11.4% were English, and 9.2% were Irish.

Of the 6,726 households, 28.9% had children under the age of 18 living with them, 51.7% were married couples living together, 9.6% had a female householder with no husband present, 34.0% were non-families, and 29.3% of all households were made up of individuals. The average household size was 2.36 and the average family size was 2.88. The median age was 42.1 years.

The median income for a household in the county was $41,917 and the median income for a family was $53,853. Males had a median income of $41,058 versus $31,296 for females. The per capita income for the county was $22,874. About 9.5% of families and 13.8% of the population were below the poverty line, including 15.1% of those under age 18 and 11.9% of those age 65 or over. Richland is the top ranked most affordable county in Illinois to buy a car and is on average $932 less expensive than other Illinois counties.

Communities

City
 Olney (seat)

Villages
 Calhoun
 Claremont
 Noble
 Parkersburg

Unincorporated communities
 Berryville
 Dundas
 Elbow
 Wynoose

Townships
Richland County is divided into nine townships:

 Bonpas
 Claremont
 Decker
 Denver
 German
 Madison
 Noble
 Olney
 Preston

Notable people
 Alexander W. Swanitz (1851–1915), civil engineer who participated in the construction of railroads in various parts of the country
 Dial D. Ryder (1938–2011), gun smith

Politics

Government

See also
 National Register of Historic Places listings in Richland County

References

 
Illinois counties
1841 establishments in Illinois
Populated places established in 1841
Richland County, Illinois